KN motif and ankyrin repeat domains 4 is a protein that in humans is encoded by the KANK4 gene.

References

Further reading